The Planisphere of Domingos Teixeira is a hand-painted parchment map of the world made by a Portuguese cartographer in 1573, during the reign of Sebastian of Portugal. It is conserved in the Bibliothèque nationale de France.

Datasheet
 Date: 1573
 Author: Domingos Teixeira (Portugal).
 Cartographic School: Portuguese.
 Brief description: World Map.
 Physical Location: Bibliothèque nationale de France

Description 
It is one of the first full world maps showing the spice routes, both the Portuguese route of Vasco da Gama, following the east route and the Spanish route towards the west, discovered by Ferdinand Magellan (shows the Terra Magellanica not yet circumnavigated by Diego Ramirez de Arellano that christened it Isla de Xativa.

You can see the scope of the  Tordesillas Meridian, both on the side of America (Brazil) and at the opposite side of the world at the Philippines, that according to the treaty of Zaragoza should belong to Portugal, as they are in the "Portuguese" hemisphere.

See also
Ancient world maps
Portuguese discoveries
World map
Windrose network
La Cartografía Mallorquina

References

External links
Gallica - BnF : Planisphère de Domingos Teixeira 1573

1573 works
Historic maps of the world
Portuguese exploration in the Age of Discovery
16th-century maps and globes